Paul Rowley (born 12 March 1975) is an English rugby league coach and former professional rugby league footballer who played in the 1990s and 2000s. He is the current head-coach of Salford Red Devils.
An England representative , he played at club level for Leigh, Halifax and Huddersfield. After retiring as a player, Rowley began a coaching career and was appointed head coach of Leigh in 2012, leading the club to Championship titles in 2014 and 2015 before departing at the beginning of the 2016 season. He subsequently was the head coach of the Toronto Wolfpack in the Betfred Championship.

Background
Rowley was born in Leigh, Greater Manchester, England.

Playing career
Having begun his career at Leigh, Rowley appeared in the Super League for Halifax and the Huddersfield Giants, returning to his hometown club in 2002. He retired as a player in April 2007 after his 400th career appearance, and joined the coaching staff at Leigh Centurions.

International honours
Rowley won caps for England while at Halifax in 1996 against France (sub), and in the 2000 Rugby League World Cup against Australia, Russia, and Ireland.

Coaching career
Rowley was appointed first team coach of Leigh Centurions on a permanent basis in January 2012. After a successful first season in charge which included guiding the club to 2nd in the Championship and a Northern Rail Cup semi-final, Rowley was named Championship Coach of the year. In February 2013 Rowley signed a new contract to keep him at the club until the end of 2015. Having won back-to-back Championship titles with Leigh in 2014 and 2015, Rowley resigned as Leigh Centurions head coach 10 days before the start of the 2016 Championship season, citing personal reasons. On 27 April 2016 he was confirmed as the inaugural head coach of the Toronto Wolfpack.
 
On 5 Nov 2021 he was announced as the new head-coach of Salford Red Devils

Personal life
Paul Rowley is the son of the rugby league  who played in the 1970s and 1980s for Leigh, Workington Town, St. Helens and Carlisle; Allan Rowley (born ). Paul Rowley has two sons, Alex and Oliver.

Honours

As a player 
 National League One: 2004

As a coach 
 Championship (3): 2014, 2015, 2018
 League 1 (1): 2017

Individual 
 Championship Coach of the Year: 2013

References

External links 
 (archived by web.archive.org) Toronto Wolfpack profile
 Leigh Centurions profile
 (archived by web.archive.org) The Teams: England
Leigh Reporter
Search for "Paul Rowley" at bbc.co.uk

  

 

1975 births
Living people
England national rugby league team players
English rugby league coaches
English rugby league players
Halifax R.L.F.C. players
Huddersfield Giants players
Leigh Leopards captains
Leigh Leopards coaches
Leigh Leopards players
Rugby league hookers
Rugby league players from Leigh, Greater Manchester
Salford Red Devils coaches
Toronto Wolfpack coaches